Dario Dossi (born 2 February 1977 in Italy) is an Italian retired footballer.

References

Italian footballers
Association football defenders
1977 births
Living people
U.S.D. Atletico Catania players
U.S. Pergolettese 1932 players
A.C. Montichiari players
S.S.D. Pro Sesto players
Serie C players